Martin Geoffrey Smith (born 13 November 1974 in Sunderland, England) is a former professional footballer. In his professional career he played for Darlington, Northampton Town, Huddersfield Town, Sheffield United, Sunderland and Blyth Spartans.

At his first club, Sunderland, he was part of two Division One title winning teams which won promotion to the FA Premier League, and while he was at Sunderland he made his only appearance for the England under-21 side on 15 November 1994.

Many Northampton Town supporters regard Smith as one of the most technically gifted players ever to represent the club. He memorably scored the winner in a FA Cup 3rd Round replay away at Rotherham in January 2004 giving the Cobblers a 4th round tie at home to Manchester United.

Smith joined Darlington ahead of the 2006–07 season. Sunderland born Smith started his career on Wearside. Dubbed 'The Son of Pele' by Sunderland fanzine A Love Supreme (fanzine), he scored twenty-eight times in 107 starts for the North East giants in a seven-year spell, moving to Sheffield United (scoring fifteen times in 30 starts for the Blades), before joining Huddersfield Town.

Smith went on to score thirty goals in seventy-five starts, including seventeen during the 2002–03 season as the Terriers were relegated. He signed for Northampton Town from Huddersfield Town on 1 July 2003 after being chased for a few months by their then manager Martin Wilkinson. Smith started as a forward; however in recent seasons he has been used as a midfielder, continuing to regularly find the net for Northampton during their promotion from League Two during the 2005–06 season.

At the end of that season the then Northampton Town manager Colin Calderwood left for Nottingham Forest. Smith enjoyed a good relationship with Calderwood and although new Northampton Town manager John Gorman worked hard to try to keep Smith at the Sixfields Stadium, Darlington (managed at the time by David Hodgson) eventually got their man.

On 19 March 2008, Smith's contract with Darlington was cancelled. On 29 August 2008 Martin Smith signed for Conference North side Blyth Spartans and made his debut the next day in the 3–0 win against Hucknall Town coming on as a late sub.

In August 2010 he signed for Kettering Town F.C. on non-contract terms.

In February 2015, he made an appearance, alongside another former professional, David Duke, for Sassco.co.uk in their victory over Sunderland Deaf FC.

References

External links
Martin Smith's participation in a winning 5-a-side team in 2009

1974 births
Living people
Footballers from Sunderland
Association football forwards
English footballers
England under-21 international footballers
Sunderland A.F.C. players
Sheffield United F.C. players
Huddersfield Town A.F.C. players
Northampton Town F.C. players
Darlington F.C. players
Blyth Spartans A.F.C. players
Premier League players
English Football League players
Kettering Town F.C. players
People educated at Monkwearmouth School